Jonny Fairplay (born Jon Dalton, March 11, 1974) is an American former art consultant, professional wrestler, and reality television personality. He has twice competed on the reality competition TV show Survivor, coming in third place on the seventh season, Survivor: Pearl Islands and coming in last at twentieth place on the sixteenth season, Survivor: Micronesia.

Early life
Jon Dalton was born March 11, 1974, and is originally from Danville, Virginia. He attended George Washington High School, and subsequently attended Virginia Tech. After college, he moved to Washington, D.C. and Portland, Oregon before settling in Los Angeles.

Reality television

Survivor: Pearl Islands
On Survivor: Pearl Islands, Dalton constructed what host Jeff Probst called "the greatest lie in Survivor history." Prior to leaving for Panama to compete on the show, Dalton concocted a plan with a close friend of his named Dan, whom Dalton had designated to participate in a challenge that would involve contestants' loved ones. To generate sympathy for Dalton and give him an advantage in the game, Dan would dishonestly inform Dalton that his grandmother had died. In the season's eleventh episode, Dan did so in front of the remaining competitors, who allowed a seemingly distraught Dalton to win the challenge in order to give him the opportunity to spend time with Dan and obtain more information about his grandmother's alleged death. Though the remaining contestants would not discover the truth until after the season had completed filming, it was quickly revealed to the television audience that Dalton's grandmother had not died but was, in fact, at home "watching Jerry Springer".

Probst also publicly said:

Danny Bonaduce altercation
On October 2, 2007, at the Fox Reality Really Awards, Dalton was invited to present an award and was loudly booed by the audience while speaking on stage. Actor and political commentator Danny Bonaduce approached Dalton on stage and said, "They're booing because they hate you." As Bonaduce then began walking away, Dalton followed and leaped on top of him, causing Bonaduce to react by flipping Dalton over his head and dropping him to the floor hard on his face. Dalton immediately left the stage, visibly bleeding from his face and allegedly losing a number of teeth.

In an interview with website TMZ soon after, Dalton stated that he had filed a police report over the incident and that authorities were waiting to review video of the incident before pressing battery charges against Bonaduce. On October 5, 2007, three days after the incident, Los Angeles Deputy District Attorney Jeffrey Boxer announced that Bonaduce would not be facing charges, stating that there was "insufficient evidence" that Bonaduce's actions were criminal. Boxer noted that Bonaduce's actions "fell within the realm of self-defense", as Dalton had initiated the physical conflict.

At the 2008 Fox Reality Really Awards, Dalton and Bonaduce appeared together onstage and joked about the previous year's incident. In a scripted scene, Dalton kissed Bonaduce on the lips, and Bonaduce subsequently spit an object out of his mouth which he joked was another one of Dalton's teeth.

Survivor: Micronesia
On January 3, 2008, it was announced that Fairplay was the only pre-All-Stars castaway who accepted an offer to join the tribe of returning contestants in Survivor: Micronesia — Fans vs. Favorites, the show's 16th season. However, Fairplay asked his tribe to vote him off in the first episode so that he could return to his pregnant girlfriend.

Subsequent Survivor appearances
Fairplay did not participate in Survivor: Heroes vs. Villains in 2010. When asked about the reason for this, Jeff Probst remarked, "The reason that Fairplay isn't here is that this season is called Heroes vs. Villains, not Survivor Quitters." Fairplay acknowledged in a 2010 interview that there is animosity between himself and Probst, stating, "It's no secret that Jeff Probst hates me, and I don't go out of my way to be his friend either."

In 2013, Fairplay was inducted into the Xfinity "Survivor Hall of Fame," alongside Kim Spradlin and John Cochran. Fairplay was the only non-winner inducted into the Class of 2013.

Other appearances
Dalton and his wife Michelle appeared on The Celebrity Newlywed Game, on which he beat the Monkees' Davy Jones and his wife; as well as on Dr. Phil in an episode titled 'Reality TV Stars' Real Life Drama' . He has also appeared on Celebrity Poker Showdown, Celebrity Fear Factor, Pawn Stars, and Camp Reality.

Dalton is also under contract with Wizard World to appear at its comic book conventions.

On March 29, 2022, he appeared as a plaintiff on Judge Steve Harvey against Wrestling Promoter Ronnie Gossett.

Professional wrestling
Dalton started in professional wrestling in 1998 in North Carolina and then moved to Oregon where, as Jonny Fairplay, he started his own promotion, New Dimension Wrestling (not to be confused with a similarly named Carolinas' promotion with which he claimed to be affiliated). There he served as promoter and commentator. During this time, he also ran his own weekly online professional wrestling radio talk show, having various wrestlers on as guest commentators. He worked as a personal assistant for the professional wrestler "Rowdy" Roddy Piper for a year and a half prior to Survivor.

After his first Survivor appearance, Dalton was signed to Total Nonstop Action Wrestling, where he appeared under the Jonny Fairplay moniker. In mid January, promo began airing hyping his debut in the company. He made his debut on January 21, but was interrupted by A.J. Styles. The two feuded for several weeks, and on February 25, Fairplay brought in Lex Luger to get revenge on Styles and cost him the NWA World Tag Team Championship. He made brief, non-wrestling appearances in 2005 at both Final Resolution and Destination X.

On October 7, 2006, Fairplay was defeated by Molly Holly after a low blow and quick pin fall at a WCWA event. One month later, Fairplay and the Hardkore Kidd defeated Frankie Kazarian. Dalton also made an appearance in Ring of Honor, an American professional wrestling promotion, on March 31, 2007, in Detroit, Michigan.

On April 1, 2011, Fairplay made an appearance for Dragon Gate USA, endorsing Jimmy Rave as the promotion's next breakout star. After Rave was defeated in a match by Arik Cannon, Fairplay entered the ring, confronted Cannon and got on the receiving end of his finishing maneuver, Total Anarchy.

On May 3, 2011, Jonny Fairplay appeared on the debut televised event of WFX Wrestling in a backstage scene in which he swindled U-Gene out of pocket money with a trick reminiscent of his famous Survivor lie. The following week Fairplay convinced U-Gene to sign a contract making Fairplay his 'manager slash best friend' promising to make him the biggest star in reality television. On the third episode of Overload, Fairplay is overheard by U-Gene while bragging about having stole all of his money. After chasing Fairplay to ringside, U-Gene was physically attacked by Fairplay before he revealed he had used his money to help male bodybuilder and former Big Brother contestant Jessie Godderz join the roster of WFX.

Starting in May 2014, Fairplay has appeared in the West Coast Wrestling Connection as the on-screen manager of Ashton Vuitton.

Personal life
As of March 2021, Dalton lives in his native Danville, Virginia.

Dalton and his girlfriend, Michelle Deighton, a contestant from WWE's Tough Enough 2011 and the fourth season of America's Next Top Model, had a daughter born in 2008, and lived in Providence, North Carolina. Dalton announced that he was separating from Deighton on June 28, 2011, via Twitter.

On December 18, 2020, Dalton and his mother Patsy Hall were arrested on larceny charges. According to the Danville, Virginia Police Department's report, they were accused of stealing jewelry and furniture valued at $5,000 from Dalton's grandmother, Jean Cook, following a criminal complaint filed by Dalton's disgruntled aunt. Charges against both people were dismissed due to insufficient evidence on March 25, 2021.

Filmography
Judge Steve Harvey (March 29, 2022) as Himself
West Coast Wrestling Connection (2014–present)
Judge Alex (October 31, 2012)
WFX Overload (2011–present)
I Love the New Millennium (2008)
Survivor: Micronesia (2008)
Ty Murray's Celebrity Bull Riding Challenge (2007)
Judge Mathis (February 2, 2007)
Fear Factor Episodes: Reality Stars: Parts 1 and 2 (2006)
True Life Episode: I'm a Reality Star (2006)
Celebrity Poker Showdown (2005)
Inked, Season One, Episode 15 (Trouble In Paradise) (2005) as himself
The Scorned (2005) as D.Q.
Kill Reality (2005)
The Daily Buzz (October 27, 2004)
50 Most Outrageous TV Moments (2004)
Survivor: Pearl Islands (2003)

References

External links
Jonny Fairplay biography for Survivor: Pearl Islands at CBS.com
Jonny Fairplay biography for Survivor: Micronesia at CBS.com

1974 births
Living people
American male professional wrestlers
People from Danville, Virginia
Professional wrestlers from Virginia
Professional wrestling announcers
Professional wrestling promoters
Survivor (American TV series) contestants